There are three airports operating in Antigua and Barbuda, a nation lying between the Caribbean Sea and the Atlantic Ocean. Antigua and Barbuda consists of two major inhabited islands, Antigua and Barbuda, and a number of smaller islands (including Great Bird, Green, Guinea, Long, Maiden and York Islands). Separated by a few nautical miles, the group is in the middle of the Leeward Islands, part of the Lesser Antilles.



Airports 
Boldface indicates the airport has scheduled passenger service on commercial airlines.

Heliports

See also 

 Transport in Antigua and Barbuda
 List of airports by ICAO code: T#TA - Antigua and Barbuda
 Wikipedia: WikiProject Aviation/Airline destination lists: North America#Antigua and Barbuda

References 

 
  – includes IATA codes
 Great Circle Mapper: Antigua and Barbuda – IATA codes, ICAO codes and coordinates

 
Antigua and Barbuda
Airports
Antigua and Barbuda
Airports